The Mining Association of the United Kingdom is a trade association for all kinds of mining undertaken by UK companies.

Function
It promotes and fosters the interests of the metals and mining industry in any part of the world and the corporations, companies, firms and persons engaged or interested in the industry or in industries ancillary to or allied with the metals and minerals industry.

Its members include all the major industrial mineral mining operators in the United Kingdom. Its work is concentrated on representing its member's interest at Government and European level on environmental and health & safety issues. It is actively involved in lobbying and consulting on proposed legislation.

It is an active member of Euromines (the European Mining Federation) and values the access and links to European Commission legislative procedures, which this brings. The majority of new legislation which has impact on the mining sector originates in Brussels. Therefore, the Association is committed to participating in Europe.

It represents the commercial interest of the UK's mining industry outside of coal mining, and includes industries mining:
 Potash (potassium carbonate)
 Salt
 Sylvinite - a mixture of sylvite (potassium chloride) and halite (commonly known as rock salt - sodium chloride)
 Gypsum (calcium sulphate) - used for plaster
 Fluorspar - also known as fluorite (calcium fluoride)
 Barytes (barium sulphate)

History

Formation
It was founded in August 1946 under the name of British Overseas Mining Association. 
The founding members were:

 New Consolidated Gold Fields Ltd
 Johannesburg Consolidated Investment Co Ltd
 Mining Trust Ltd
 Rio Tinto Co Ltd
 Union Corporation Ltd
 General Mining and Finance Corporation Ltd
 Mason and Berry Ltd

The issues which the Association dealt with on behalf of this original group were mainly taxation issues.

Name change
In 1966 this name was changed to Overseas Mining Association and in 1976 the name was changed to its present style when it merged with the United Kingdom Metal Mining Association.

Structure
It is based in Lichfield in Staffordshire.

Current members
Anglesey Mining plc
Anglo American plc
Cleveland Potash Limited
British Gypsum Limited
Glebe Mines Limited
Inco Europe Limited
Institute of Materials, Minerals and Mining
Irish Salt Mining and Exploration Co. Limited
Rio Tinto plc
Salt Union Limited
United Kingdom Nirex Limited
Wardell Armstrong
IMC Group
Camborne School of Mines, University of Exeter
National Coal Mining Museum for England

External links
 The Mining Association of the United Kingdom website
 Euromines

Mining trade associations
Mining in the United Kingdom
Organizations established in 1946
Trade associations based in the United Kingdom
Organisations based in Staffordshire
Lichfield
1946 establishments in the United Kingdom